The United States Short Course National Championships or USA Swimming Winter Nationals is a national championship meet organized by USA Swimming. The competition is swum short course yards (SCY), in a pool 25-yards long. The meet's most recent incarnation began in 2007 and was held annually in November or December until 2018 when it returned to being held in March.

Prior to 1991, the annual spring U.S. national championships were swum as a 25-yard meet; however, from 1991-2007, the meet was held as a long course (50m) meet. In the mid-2000s, USA Swimming decided to revive a Nationals meet in the short-course-yards format, but decided that the meet should be in December, rather than the late-March/early April time frame that the Spring Nationals had turned into. For 2016 USA Swimming returned to the old format with two short course Nationals in one year, American Short Course Championships in March in Austin and the Winter National Championships in Atlanta in December.

Editions

Championships records

Men

Women

References

Short Course
National swimming competitions
National championships in the United States